Local elections in Mandaluyong was held on May 13, 2013 within the Philippine general election. The voters elected for the elective local posts in the city: the mayor, vice mayor, one Congressman, and the councilors, six in each of the city's two legislative districts.

Results

For Mayor 
Outgoing mayor Benhur Abalos was seeking re-election for a third and final term under the banner of Lakas-CMD against outgoing vice mayor Danny de Guzman who was running under the banner of Aksyon Demokratiko. Independent candidate Florencio Solomon also joined the race for mayor.

For Vice Mayor 
Outgoing second district councilor Edward Bartolome ran for the position of vice mayor under the banner of the Liberal Party. Independent candidate Doki Pe also joined the race for Mandaluyong's vice mayor.

For Representative 
Outgoing lone district representative Neptali Gonzales II ran for a third consecutive term under the banner of the Liberal Party. Fellow candidates Frank Reyes, a candidate of the Ang Kapatiran party, and Gerard Castillo and Renato Parem, both independent candidates, were also vying a seat as Mandaluyong's district representative.

For Councilors

1st Dustrict

References 

2013 Philippine local elections
Politics of Mandaluyong